The Serie B 1994–95 was the sixty-third tournament of this competition played in Italy since its creation.

Teams
Chievo, Como, Perugia and Salernitana had been promoted from Serie C, while Piacenza, Udinese, Atalanta and Lecce had been relegated from Serie A.

Events
Three points for a win were introduced.

The Derby della Scala had its first edition.

Final classification

Results

Serie B seasons
2
Italy